Seo-Young Chu (born February 14, 1978) is a Korean American scholar, poet, #MeToo activist, and associate professor of English at Queens College, CUNY. She is the author of Do Metaphors Dream of Literal Sleep? A Science-Fictional Theory of Representation.

Chu is best known for her work as an activist against rape culture on college campuses. She frequently campaigns for universities and colleges to create more robust sexual harassment policies, and enforce them. She also regularly speaks out on behalf of college sexual assault victims, encouraging the universities to take accusations seriously, respond with compassion, and provide help to victims.

Life 

According to Chu's autobiographical essay "Free Indirect Suicide," published in The Rumpus in March 2019, Chu was born in 1978 in Northern Virginia to Korean parents. The Amazon author biography for Chu describes her as a "queer agnostic spinster".

In 2000, Chu was sexually harassed and assaulted by her then-dissertation adviser Jay Fliegelman. In 2017 Chu published "A Refuge for Jae-in Doe," in Entropy Magazine, in which Chu wrote about being abused at Stanford and living with posttraumatic stress. The publication became part of the dialogue about #MeToo. "A Refuge for Jae-in Doe" was selected for inclusion in The Best American Nonrequired Reading 2018.

Education 
In 1999 Chu earned a B.A. degree from Yale. In 2001, Chu earned a M.A. degree from Stanford. In 2007, Chu earned a Ph.D. degree from Harvard.

Work 

Chu has written and spoken about science fiction, the DMZ in Korea, postmemory han, poetry, North Korea, her experiences as a survivor of sexual violence in the English Department at Stanford University, and her struggles with bipolar disorder and suicidal ideation.

References 

American academics of Korean descent
1978 births
Living people
American women academics
Academics from Virginia
Stanford University alumni
Yale University alumni
Harvard University alumni
Queens College, City University of New York faculty
21st-century American women